The 2019 Critérium du Dauphiné was the 71st edition of the Critérium du Dauphiné, a road cycling stage race. The race took place between 9 and 16 June 2019, in France and Switzerland. On 25 March 2019, the race organisers, the Amaury Sport Organisation (ASO), announced the route at a presentation in Lyon.

Teams
The eighteen UCI WorldTeams were automatically invited to participate. In total, twenty-two teams started the race, with seven riders per team:

Pre-race favourites
Chris Froome was the favourite for the race, having won three previous editions. Defending champion Geraint Thomas was not in the field. Jakob Fuglsang, Richie Porte, Nairo Quintana and Tom Dumoulin were considered as the nearest rivals.

Route

Stages

Stage 1
9 June 2019 - Aurillac to Jussac,

Stage 2
10 June 2019 - Mauriac to Craponne-sur-Arzon,

Stage 3
11 June 2019 - Le Puy-en-Velay to Riom,

Stage 4
12 June 2019 - Roanne to Roanne,  (ITT)

Pre-race favourite Chris Froome suffered a crash during the route reconnaissance before the stage, resulting in fractures of the pelvis, femur, elbow and ribs. Team principal Dave Brailsford later confirmed that Froome would miss the rest of the race, and the 2019 Tour de France.

Stage 5
13 June 2019 - Boën-sur-Lignon to Voiron,

Stage 6
14 June 2019 - Saint-Vulbas to Saint-Michel-de-Maurienne,

Stage 7
15 June 2019 - Saint-Genix-les-Villages to Les Sept Laux-Pipay, 

Tom Dumoulin, one of the pre-race favourites, withdrew from the race before the start of the stage. During the stage, the weather started sunny, but the day's last two climbs occurred in heavy rain.

Stage 8
16 June 2019 - Cluses to Champéry (Switzerland), 

Adam Yates, second place on the general classification, abandoned the race in the final .

Classification leadership table
In the Critérium du Dauphiné, four different jerseys were awarded. The most important was the general classification, which was calculated by adding each cyclist's finishing times on each stage. Time bonuses were awarded to the first three finishers on all stages except for the individual time trial: the stage winner won a ten-second bonus, with six and four seconds for the second and third riders respectively. The rider with the least accumulated time is the race leader, identified by a yellow jersey with a blue bar; the winner of this classification was considered the winner of the race.

Additionally, there was a points classification, which awarded a green jersey. In the classification, cyclists received points for finishing in the top 10 in a stage. More points were awarded on the flatter stages in the opening half of the race.

There was also a mountains classification, the leadership of which was marked by a blue jersey with white polka dots. In the mountains classification, points towards the classification were won by reaching the top of a climb before other cyclists. Each climb was categorised as either hors, first, second, third, or fourth-category, with more points available for the higher-categorised climbs. Hors-category climbs awarded the most points; the first ten riders were able to accrue points, compared with the first six on first-category climbs, the first four on second-category, the first two on third-category and only the first for fourth-category.

The fourth jersey represented the young rider classification, marked by a white jersey. This was decided the same way as the general classification, but only riders born on or after 1 January 1993 were eligible to be ranked in the classification. There was also a team classification, in which the times of the best three cyclists per team on each stage were added together; the leading team at the end of the race was the team with the lowest total time.

Final classification standings

General classification

Points classification

Mountains classification

Young rider classification

Teams classification

References

External links
Official site

2019 UCI World Tour
2019 in French sport
2019 in Swiss sport
2019
June 2019 sports events in France